Hydromantes, commonly referred to as web-toed salamanders, is a genus of the lungless salamander family, Plethodontidae; they achieve respiration through their skin and the tissues lining their mouth. They are endemic to mountains of California in the United States. Salamanders of this genus are distinguished in having extremely long tongues that they can project to 80% of their body length. Similar species endemic to southern France and Italy are now classified in a distinct genus, Speleomantes.

Species
The following five species are placed in this genus:

References

External links
 . 2007. Amphibian Species of the World: an Online Reference. Version 5.2 (15 July 2008). Hydromantes. Electronic Database accessible at https://web.archive.org/web/20071024033938/http://research.amnh.org/herpetology/amphibia/index.php. American Museum of Natural History, New York, USA. (Accessed: August 1, 2008). 
  [web application]. 2008. Berkeley, California: Hydromantes. AmphibiaWeb, available at http://amphibiaweb.org/. (Accessed: August 1, 2008).

 
Extant Pleistocene first appearances
Amphibian genera
Taxonomy articles created by Polbot